Coldstream Football Club is a Scottish football club from the town of Coldstream in the Scottish Borders. Formed in 1895, the club is one of the founder members of the East of Scotland Football League, and is now also the longest-serving member. Coldstream won the league's first championship in 1923–24 but have not managed to win the title since. The team have played home matches at Home Park since the club was formed. The team's strip is all blue.

As a licensed member club of the Scottish Football Association, Coldstream are eligible to play in the Scottish Cup.  The first time the club won through the Scottish Qualifying Cup was in 1923–24, the club 1–0 at home to Armadale F.C. in the first round before of a crowd of 4,000.  The club has never beaten a Scottish League team in the Cup, but it has twice held League clubs to draws.

Honours
East of Scotland Football League
 Champions: 1923–24
 Runners-up: 1968–69
East of Scotland Football League First Division
 Champions: 1989–90
 Runners-up: 2006–07, 2012–13
King Cup
 Winners: 1967–68
East of Scotland Consolation Cup
 Winners: 1924-25 
Border Cup
 Winners: 1911–12, 1921-22, 1922-23, 1924-25
Border Senior League
 Champions: 1919-20, 1922-23
Scottish Amateur Cup
 Winners: 1924-25

References

External links
 Coldstream's website
 Scottish Cup results

Football clubs in Scotland
Association football clubs established in 1895
1895 establishments in Scotland
East of Scotland Football League teams
Coldstream
Football clubs in the Scottish Borders